Peter B. Bensinger (born 1936 in Chicago, Illinois) is a former Administrator of the Drug Enforcement Administration (DEA). He served from February 1976 to July 1981 in this position. He was appointed Acting Administrator on January 23, 1976, and confirmed by the United States Senate on February 5, 1976. Bensinger was sworn in as administrator on February 23, 1976.

He served in the administrations of Presidents Gerald Ford, Jimmy Carter and Ronald Reagan. During his tenure with the DEA, Operation Trizo was established and started. With that operation, the DEA and the Mexican government fought illegal poppy plantations in Mexico by destroying crops with spraying and lead to many arrests of drug offenders.

Bensinger graduated from Phillips Exeter Academy. After graduation from Yale University, he worked as a General sales manager with the Brunswick Corporation (1958–1968) and with the Illinois Attorney General among other positions. In 1982, Bensinger became president and CEO of Bensinger, DuPont & Associates in Chicago, established 1982.

Awards
Peter B. Bensinger was inducted as a Laureate of The Lincoln Academy of Illinois and awarded the Order of Lincoln (the State's highest honor) by the Governor of Illinois in 1998 in the area of Government.

References

External links
www.usdoj.gov/dea
www.deamuseum.org — DEA History book

Drug Enforcement Administration Administrators
1936 births
People from Chicago
Living people
Yale University alumni
American chief executives
Phillips Exeter Academy alumni